Olympic Real de Bangui is a football (soccer) club from Central African Republic based in Bangui. Previously its name was Réal Olympique Castel.

Achievements
Central African Republic League : 12
 1971, 1973, 1975, 1979, 1982, 2000, 2001, 2004, 2010, 2012, 2016, 2017.

Central African Republic Coupe Nationale : 2
 1989, 1999.

Performance in CAF competitions
CAF Champions League / African Cup of Champions Clubs: 6 appearances

1972 – First round
1983 – First round
2002 – Preliminary round

2011 – Preliminary round
2013 – Preliminary round
2017 – Preliminary round

African Cup Winners' Cup: 2 appearances
1990 – First round
2000 – Preliminary round

Current Players

mbise mbise

None

External links
Team profile - Soccerway.com

Football clubs in the Central African Republic
Bangui
1945 establishments in Ubangi-Shari
Association football clubs established in 1945